Hans Wilhelm Heinrich Ehelolf (July 30, 1881 – May 29, 1939) was a German Hittitologist.

He was born in Hanover, Lower Saxony.  He began his oriental studies in Marburg, focusing on Assyriology, Semitic linguistics, Indology, and Biblical exegesis.  He wrote a PhD thesis entitled Ein Wortfolgeprinzip im Assyrisch-Babylonischen and received his degree on July 29, 1914.  Ehelolf served in World War I and was awarded the Iron Cross 2nd Class and the Turkish Iron Crescent.

Works

 Der altassyrische Kalender; with Benno Landsberger, in ZDMG 74, S. 216ff.
 Ein altassyrisches Rechtsbuch; translation by Hans Ehelolf (1922).
 Wettlauf und Spiel im hethitischen Ritual, in Sitzungsberichteder preussischen Akademie der Wissenschaften (1925).
 Das hethitische Ritual des Papanikri von Komana; with Ferdinand Sommer, Boghazköi-Studien, Book 10 (1924).

References

External links
 

1881 births
1939 deaths
Writers from Hanover
University of Marburg alumni
Hittitologists
Recipients of the Iron Cross (1914), 2nd class